Chorizontes ("separators") was the name given to the ancient Alexandrian critics who believed the Iliad and Odyssey were by different poets. The best known of them were the grammarians Xenon and Hellanicus, but they are nonetheless extremely obscure figures about whom nothing else is known. Aristarchus of Samothrace was one of their opponents.

See also
 Homeric scholarship

References

Literary criticism
Iliad
Odyssey
Homeric scholarship